Major League Baseball recognizes runs scored leaders in the American League and National League each season. In baseball, a run is scored when a player advances safely around first, second and third base and returns safely to home plate, touching the bases in that order, before three outs are recorded. A player may score by hitting a home run or by any combination of plays that puts him safely "on base" (that is, on first, second, or third) as a runner and subsequently brings him home. The object of the game is for a team to score more runs than its opponent.

In baseball statistics, a player who advances around all the bases to score is credited with a run (R), sometimes referred to as a "run scored."  While runs scored is considered an important individual batting statistic, it is regarded as less significant than runs batted in (RBIs)—superiority in the latter, for instance, is one of the elements of the exceptional batting achievement known as the Triple Crown. Both individual runs scored and runs batted in are heavily context-dependent; for a more sophisticated assessment of a player's contribution toward producing runs for his team, see runs created.

American League

National League

American Association

Federal League

Player's League

Union Association

National Association

References

Yearly League Leaders & Records for Runs Scored (Baseball-Reference.com)

Runs scored
Runs